Astragalus anserinus, also called the Goose Creek milkvetch, is a member of the genus Astragalus that is listed as a candidate species under the Endangered Species Act. It grows in a  area of the Goose Watershed of the Upper Snake Basin in Idaho, Nevada and Utah.

References

External links
The Nature Conservancy
Atwood, N. D., et al. (1984). New Astragalus (Leguminosae) from the Goose Creek drainage Utah-Nevada. Great Basin Naturalist.

anserinus
Plants described in 1984
Flora of Nevada
Flora of Utah
Flora of Idaho
Endangered plants